Bjervamoen is part of Lunde in Nome municipality, Norway. It is located west of the municipality centre Ulefoss, and was itself the centre in the former municipality Lunde. Its population is 1,422.

References

Villages in Vestfold og Telemark
Nome, Norway